Raisa Andreevna Obodovskaya (6 August 1948 – 30 July 2012) was a Soviet track and road cyclist. Between 1967 and 1970 she won two gold and two silver medals in the 3 km individual pursuit at world championships, as well as a bronze in the road race in 1970.

In November 1969 she married Yury Gladkov, and later gave birth to daughters Marina and Tanya. She resumed competitions in the late 1970s and won three national titles in road events in 1979–1981. She retired in 1984 and later worked as a director of sports school in Kharkiv.

References 

1948 births
2012 deaths
Ukrainian female cyclists
Soviet female cyclists
UCI Track Cycling World Champions (women)
Ukrainian track cyclists
Sportspeople from Kharkiv Oblast